Novomlynka is a rural locality (a selo) in Starodubsky District, Bryansk Oblast, Russia. The population was 268 as of 2010. There are 3 streets.

Geography 
Novomlynka is located 23 km south of Starodub (the district's administrative centre) by road. Privalovka is the nearest rural locality.

References 

Rural localities in Starodubsky District